Basil cultivars are cultivated varieties of basil. They are used in a variety of ways: as culinary herbs, landscape plants, healing herbs, teas, and worship implements. All true basils are species of the genus Ocimum. The genus is particularly diverse, and includes annuals, non-woody perennials and shrubs native to Africa and other tropical and subtropical regions of the Old and New World. Although it is estimated that there are 50 to 150 species of basil, most, but not all, culinary basils are cultivars of O. basilicum, or sweet basil. Some are cultivars of other basil species, and others are hybrids. It is particularly challenging to determine which species a basil belongs to. This is because basil cross-breeds easily, and drawing boundaries between species is particularly difficult. In fact, recent studies have led to reclassification of some portions of the genus.

Basil cultivars vary in several ways. Visually, the size and shape of the leaves varies greatly, from the large lettuce-like leaves of the Mammoth basil and Lettuce leaf basil to the tiny leaves of the Dwarf bush basil. More practically, the fragrance of the basil varies due to the varying types and quantities of essential oils contained in the plants. The most important are 1,8 cineol, linalool, citral, methyl chavicol (estragole), eugenol and methyl cinnamate, although hardly any basil contains all of these in any significant amount.

Basil cultivars

See also 

 International Code of Nomenclature for Cultivated Plants
 Lists of cultivars

References

General references

 
 

Basil
Gardening lists
Ocimum
Lists of foods
Lists of cultivars